The Engelbert B. Born House is a private house located at 128 Hill Street in Allegan, Michigan. It was added to the National Register of Historic Places in 1987.

History
Englebert B. Born arrived in the United States from Nassau, Germany in 1852. In 1854, he founded the Allegan Wagon and Carriage Factory. The factory prospered, and Born constructed this house in 1863.

Description
The Engelbert B. Born House is a two-story, L-shaped, frame Italianate structure on a masonry foundation. It is sided with clapboard and has paneled pilasters on the corners. The low-pitched hipped roof widely overhangs the walls, and has a cupola at the top.

References

National Register of Historic Places in Allegan County, Michigan
Italianate architecture in Michigan
Residential buildings completed in 1863